Narrgnistor och transkriptioner (English: Foolishnesses and transcriptions) is album by Cornelis Vreeswijk from 1976.

Track listing
Music and lyrics by Cornelis Vreeswijk unless otherwise noted.

"Balladen om båtsman Charlie Donovan"
"Herreman Jarl den onde"
"Till Bacchus på Bellmans vis"
"En inskription"
"Visa till polaren Per när han gick in i dimman"
"Visa till dig"
"Till visans vänner"
"Åttio (80) små lökar"
"Visa vid Nybroviken"
"Marcuses skog"
"Transkription för Søren Kierkegaard"
"Balladen om Nils Johan Einar Ferlin"

References

Cornelis Vreeswijk albums
1976 albums